The Charles H. Burke House, at 36 Stewart St. in Reno, Nevada, is a historic house with Colonial Revival and Queen Anne elements that was designed and built by Charles H. Burke in 1908.

It was listed on the National Register of Historic Places in 1984. Burke developed a subdivision termed the Burke's Addition, and more, in southeast Reno.

See also 
Burke-Berryman House, 418 Cheney St., Reno, also NRHP-listed

References 

Houses in Reno, Nevada
Colonial Revival architecture in Nevada
Houses completed in 1908
Houses on the National Register of Historic Places in Nevada
National Register of Historic Places in Reno, Nevada
Queen Anne architecture in Nevada
1908 establishments in Nevada